Xinjie Township (Mandarin: 新街回族乡) or Xinjie Ethnic Township is a township in Guide County, Hainan Tibetan Autonomous Prefecture, Qinghai, China. In 2010, Xinjie Township had a total population of 4,730 people: 2,378 males and 2,352 females: 1,228 under 14 years old, 3,155 aged between 15 and 64 and 347 over 65 years old.

References 

Guide County
Township-level divisions of Qinghai
Ethnic townships of the People's Republic of China